"Don't Let the Music Die" is a pop ballad by the Bay City Rollers from their 1977 album It's a Game.  The tune, written by Eric Faulkner and Stuart Wood, and featuring a lead vocal by Les McKeown, is a slow, dramatic ballad with a heavily-orchestrated arrangement and melancholy feel.  It was released as a 7" double A-side vinyl single (with "The Way I Feel Tonight") in Japan, where it became a chart hit.

Track listing
1. "Don't Let the Music Die" - 5:47
2. "The Way I Feel Tonight" - 3:56

Credits
 Producer - Harry Maslin
 Written By - Eric Faulkner, Stuart "Woody" Wood

Chart performance
 Japan: #__

References

External links
Lyrics of this song
 

Songs about music
Bay City Rollers songs
Songs written by Eric Faulkner
1977 singles
Songs written by Stuart Wood (musician)
1977 songs
EMI Records singles